The Government Law College, Mumbai, (GLC Mumbai), India, founded in 1855, is the  one of the oldest law schools in Asia.  The college, affiliated to the University of Mumbai, is run by the Government of Maharashtra.

Bal Gangadhar Tilak ,Pratibha Patil, former President of India, and six Chief Justices of India, as well as several judges of the Supreme Court of India are alumni of the college.

History

Origins and founding

Until the 1850s there was no formal legal education for legal officers and lawyers in India. Sir Thomas Erskine Perry, the then Chief Justice of the Supreme Court of Judicature at Bombay, would deliver lectures on law after court hours. These classes were held on a very informal basis and were attended only by a select group.

However, it was not till Sir Perry left for England in 1852, that a conscious effort was made to collect funds in order to institute a chair in Jurisprudence at the Elphinstone Institution, the Perry Professorship of Jurisprudence, and Dr. R. T. Reid (first Judge of the Small Causes Court, Bombay) was appointed as the first Perry Professor of Jurisprudence. The Government Law College, the first of its kind in India, was founded in 1855 on public demand under the inspired leadership of Jagannath Shankarshet. The college has been affiliated with the University of Bombay since 1860.

Full time institution
The name Government Law School was changed to Government Law College in 1925. It was only in 1938 that the college was converted into a full-time institution. After this change of status, the Government of Bombay decided to allocate a plot, west of Churchgate railway station for the Government Law College building. The college today stands at this location.

Academics

Curriculum
Affiliated to the Mumbai University, the Government Law College follows the semester system, and provides the 5-year integrated BLS-LLB as well as the 3-year LLB course.

The 5-year course consists of a 2-year foundation in the liberal arts/sociology, followed by the 3-year curriculum of core legal subjects, which are common to the 3-year law course.

Most of the 3-year law subjects are taught by practising lawyers, rather than academics, most of them teaching part-time. The teaching, pedagogy, and curriculum for the three-year program is thus geared more towards practical professional law, rather than theoretical, academic law.

Current faculty include academics such as Prof Homer Pithawala as well as advocates practising in the higher judiciary.

Many of the more prominent faculty are alumni of the college.

Admissions
Admission to the college is through the Maharashtra Common Entrance Test - the MH LAW CET, which was introduced in 2016.

The entrance exam is compulsory for admissions for law colleges in Maharashtra, and tests legal aptitude, general knowledge, language, and reasoning skills.

85% of the seats are reserved for candidates from Maharashtra, and an overall reservation for various college seats is as high as 50%.

In 2018, over 23,000 students appeared from Maharashtra, and 16,000 students appeared for the entrance test from the rest of the country for the 3-year course.

The total number of seats are 240, and typical cut off ranks for students from the "Maharashtra General Category" is an all-India Rank of 200, while those of students from outside Maharashtra is about 120.

The 5-year course is less competitive, for many students consider alternate law schools, such as the National Law Universities, which do not offer 3-year degrees, and admit students on the basis of another test - CLAT.

In 2018, over 15,000 students appeared for the 5-year MH LAW CET admissions test. Typical cut offs for 240 BLS-LLB seats are at All India Rank 250 for Maharashtra students belonging to the "General Category".

Academic programmes

Five Year Law Course
The B.L.S. LL.B. program is a 10-semester full-time course open to students right out of high school (Class XII in the Indian system). The first 2 years (4 semesters) constitute a 'pre-law' course where the student is taught social-science subjects like economics, political science, history, English and legal language, logic, etc.

In the next three years core law subjects, like contracts, family law, labour laws, etc. are dealt with.

In their 8th and 10th semester, the students have the option of choosing some particular subjects along with some compulsory subjects. A total of 4 practical training papers are compulsory for all the students.

The BLS or the Bachelor of Legal Sciences degree is awarded to the students by the University of Mumbai after successful completion of the 3rd year and the LLB degree is awarded after completion of 5 years.

Students are eligible to exit with a Bachelor's degree in Legal Studies (BLS) at the end of 6 semesters, but cannot practise law unless they complete the course in its entirety.

Three Year Law Course
A minimum of a Bachelor's degree is required for enrolling into the LL.B. degree. The LL.B. degree is a three-year program with classes devoted solely to the study of law, and graduates are eligible to practice as an advocate, as per the Rules of the Bar Council of India. A student who desires to learn the law but does not wish to practice as an advocate is eligible for the LL.B. (General) Degree at the end of two years.

Other courses
GLC further features specialised diploma courses which include Postgraduate Diploma Course in Securities Law, Post Graduate Diploma In Intellectual Property Rights and Diploma in Cyber-Laws offered in joint-collaboration with the Asian School of Cyber Laws. Recently the college has started the Post Graduate Certificate Course in Human Rights. All courses are taught by leading practitioners and experts.

The Library
From its humble origins in 1856, GLC's library has grown into one of the foremost law libraries in the country, housing more than 42,000 books. In addition to its extensive collection of books and law reports drawn from all over the world, the library has maintained and preserved rare books that are out of print, some of which cannot be found in any other library in India. The Library additionally features a dedicated Electronic Research Room (ERR) for student use.

In 1856-57 a collection of law books was purchased for the use of the students of the college at the suggestion of Mr. E.I. Howard, Bar-at-Law and the then Director of Public Instruction.

But this could only be housed at the Native General Library at Dhobi Talao for the lack of space. Eventually, in 1891, Government Law School and its Library were accommodated in Elphinstone College Building at Kalaghoda and on 13 July 1891, the Government sanctioned a grant of Rs.2,000/- for the purchase of furniture and other equipment for the Law Library.

Every Principal in their own way tried to enrich the library in order to make it useful to the students as well as to the practitioners.

During his tenure Dr. B. R. Ambedkar prevailed upon the Government to make an additional grant of Rs. 1000/- which was sanctioned in 1936.

The Harilal J. Kania Memorial Library and Reading Room on the third floor of the college has been a part of this college since 1952.

This Reading Room was created from the Harilal J. Kania Memorial Fund, which was instituted to honour the memory of Sir Harilal J. Kania, the first Chief Justice of India and an ex-student of GLC. This Reading Room can accommodate as many as 200 students at a time.

The other two floors, i.e. the first and the second floors of the annex building, house various books on case law, many of which are more than a hundred years old.

The library enjoys the distinction of being the archival repository of the Civil Procedure Code of the East India Company’s Courts in the presidency of Fort St. George, and the original copy of the Indian Penal Code as drafted by Lord Macaulay in the year 1886.

Scholarships & Awards
The college provides scholarships to meritorious students. Special awards such as the Ranganathrao Trophy,
the Yashwant Dalal Cup for Overall Excellence, the Diwan Jotimal Chuganee Trophy and the B.M. Vardhan’s Trophy for best Debater/Elocutionist are instituted for the overall development of students.

Publications
The college has been publishing the college magazine since 1930 and the Law Review for the last few years.

Student life
The college is known for an active student life and college teams have a consistently exemplary record in many sports. The GLC campus is located at Churchgate, to the west of the railway station, with close proximity to the Bombay High Court. The college has 17 classrooms, a Mooting Room, an Auditorium, an audio-visual room and a canteen for the benefit of students. The campus has a basketball court and a mini gymkhana at the back of the auditorium (for table tennis, carom, etc.). The students also use the nearby Oval Maidan or Mumbai University ground for sports such as cricket and football. The college has no hostel of its own. However, 62 seats for male students of the College in the Government Colleges Hostel, "C" Road, Churchgate and 20 Seats for male students at the Ismail Yusuf College at Jogeshwari, Mumbai has been provided.

GLC has been encouraging activities like Moot Courts, debates, essay competitions and other activities which help improving the legal knowledge and the oratory and literary skills of the aspiring candidates. Moot court competitions have been a regular feature since 1936. The student committees also encourage sports, music, dance and drama.

List of Student Committees
 Moot Court Association
 Magazine Committee
 Smt. Vinatadevi Tope Social Service League
 Placement Committee
 Entrepreneurship and Leadership Cell
 SPIL Mumbai
 Model United Nations Society
 Alternative Dispute Resolution Cell
 Alumni Association
 Sports Committee
 Rotaract Club
 Leo Club 
 Legal Aid Committee
 National Service Scheme (Unit)
 Dramatics Committee
 Music Circle
 Hindi Parishad
 Marathi Mandal
 Gujurati Mandal
 Bazm-E-Urdu
 Debating and Literary Society
 Cultural committee

Notable people

Notable alumni

Chief Architect of the Constitution of India
 Dr. B. R. Ambedkar, first Law Minister of India, Chairman of the Constitution Drafting Committee

Chief Justices of India

 Justice H. J. Kania, first Chief Justice of India (1950-1951)
 Justice P. N. Bhagwati (1985-1986)
 Justice M. H. Kania (1991-1992)
 Justice S. P. Bharucha (2001-2002)
 Justice S. H. Kapadia (2010-2012)
 Justice U. U. Lalit (2022-2022)

Chief Justice of Nepal
 Justice Surendra Prasad Singh (1995-1997)

Supreme Court and High Court judges
 B. N. Srikrishna, former Judge, Supreme Court of India
 M. C. Chagla, 1st Indian Chief Justice of Bombay High Court
 R. M. Kantawala, former Chief Justice of Bombay High Court
Naresh Harishchandra Patil, former Chief Justice of Bombay High Court
 Ajit Prakash Shah, former Chief Justice of Delhi High Court
 Dilip Babasaheb Bhosale, Chief Justice of the High Court of Judicature at Allahabad

Senior Advocates
 A. G. Noorani, Senior Advocate of Supreme Court of India and of Bombay High Court
 Anil Divan, Senior Advocate, Supreme Court of India
 Fali S. Nariman, Senior Advocate of Supreme Court of India and President of the Bar Association of India
 H. M. Seervai, Advocate General of Maharashtra and Senior Advocate of Supreme Court of India
 Haresh Jagtiani, Senior Advocate, Bombay High Court
 Nani Palkhivala, Senior Advocate of Supreme Court of India and constitutional law expert
 Ram Jethmalani, criminal lawyer, Senior Advocate of Supreme Court of India
 Syed Sharifuddin Pirzada, Senior Advocate of Supreme Court of Pakistan, architect of the constitution of Pakistan and personal secretary to Muhammad Ali Jinnah
 Soli Sorabjee, Senior Advocate of Supreme Court and former Attorney General of India
 Mukul Rohatgi, Senior Advocate, Supreme Court of India

Non Legal Noted Alumni - Politicians, Freedom fighters, Reformers, Academia & Corporate Leaders

 Dr. B. R. Ambedkar, first Law Minister of India, Chairman of the Constitution Drafting Committee
 Shriniwas Dadasaheb Patil Shriniwas Dadasaheb Patil is an Indian politician and Ex IAS, Ex Governor of Sikkim, Member of Parliament(loksabha).
 Bal Gangadhar Tilak, freedom fighter, Noted Educationist, Journalist & Prominent Social Reformer
Smt. Pratibha Patil, former President of India
 L. K. Advani, former Deputy Prime Minister of India
 Piyush Goyal, 38th Railway Minister Of India
 M. G. Ranade, social reformer and economist
 Rahul Bajaj, Chairman, Bajaj Auto
 Asaf Ali Asghar Fyzee, Islamologist and academician
 Chandrashekhar Agashe, founder of Brihan Maharashtra Sugar Syndicate
 Ananth Prabhu Gurpur, Cyberlaw expert, Professor in Computer Engineering at the Sahyadri College of Engineering and Management

Notable Legal Office Holders
 Ashok Desai, former Solicitor General of India
 M. C. Setalvad, former Attorney General of India
 Goolam Vahanvati, former Attorney General of India
 Mukul Rohatgi, former Attorney General of India
 T. R. Andhyarujina, former Solicitor General of India

Notable Legal Professionals
 Cyril Shroff,  Managing Partner, Cyril Amarchand Mangaldas
 Shardul S. Shroff, Managing Partner, Shardul Amarchand Mangalada
 Homer Pithawalla, Solicitor & Advocate, Supreme Courts of India, 
Hong Kong & England & Professor, Government Law College, Mumbai

Prominent faculty

Throughout its history, the college has had the honour of guidance from eminent legal luminaries who have adorned benches of the Supreme Court of India and the Bombay High Court.

The long list of legends include:
B. R. Ambedkar, former principal, first Law Minister of India and Chairman, Drafting Committee of the Constitution of India
 Bal Gangadhar Tilak, Indian freedom fighter, famous as Father of Indian Discontent and one of the First Generation of Indians to have graduated.
 Sir Dinshah Fardunji Mulla, former principal, Privy Councilor, founding partner of Mulla & Mulla
 Nanabhoy Palkhivala, former professor, noted constitutional lawyer
M. C. Chagla, former professor, Chief Justice of Bombay High Court
 Ram Jethmalani, former professor, noted criminal lawyer,
 Homer Pithawalla, noted professor; solicitor of the Supreme Courts of India, England and Hong Kong

See also
List of Mumbai Colleges
Government Colleges Hostel

References

External links

Law schools in Maharashtra
Universities and colleges in Mumbai
Educational institutions established in 1855
Affiliates of the University of Mumbai
1855 establishments in India